Ashley Michelle Jones is a poet, instructor of creative writing at the Alabama School of Fine Arts, and the first Black Poet Laureate of Alabama (2022-2026) and the youngest person to hold this position. Her works deal with race and history inspired by Alabama's historical enslavement of Black men and women in the Deep South.  She is the author of ‘’Magic City Gospel", ‘’dark//thing’’, and ‘’Reparations Now!’’

Early life and education
Jones was born in Birmingham, Alabama, United States, to Donald Jones, the chief of the Midfield Fire & Rescue Service and mother Jennifer Jones. She grew up in Birmingham in the neighborhoods of Midfield and Roebuck. Jones's creativity was encouraged by her parents and Jones dreamed of becoming a writer when she was little. She started writing little books in second grade and started writing poems at the age of eight.

As a child she attended the EPIC Alternative Elementary school in Birmingham, Alabama, followed by the W.J. Christian Middle School, and then into a magnet school in 7th grade when she joined the Alabama School of Fine Arts' Creative Writing program. Her bachelor's degree summa cum laude from the University of Alabama at Birmingham was in Creative Writing, with a Spanish minor (2012). At Miami's Florida International University she earned an M.F.A. in poetry in 2017.

Career
Jones has been a faculty member in the Creative Writing Department of the Alabama School of Fine Arts since 2015. She founded the Magic City Poetry Festival, and has served as facilitator at “Poetry that Breaks Silence” in 2015. Jones was named Alabama's poet laureate in 2021, and will hold the post from 2022 until 2026. She is the first black person, and the youngest person, to hold this position. In 2022 Jones started the Alabama Poetry Delegation to allow poets in Alabama to share their work with others in the state.

Selected works
Jones is known for her poetry collections, including ‘’Magic City Gospel’’, in which she explores blackness, history and identity. This work received a silver medal in poetry in the 2017 Independent Publisher Book Awards. ‘’dark//thing’’ that delves into the issue of otherness placed on black people from her perspective and won the Lena-Miles Wever Todd Prize for Poetry. Most recently, the collection ‘’Reparations Now!’’ provides multi-voiced and bold scrutiny of black experiences, in the past and future.

Awards and honors
Jones received the 2015 Rona Jaffe Foundation Writer’s Award. She received the 2018 Lucille Clifton Poetry Prize from Backbone Press and was a finalist in the Ruth Lilly Dorothy Sargent Rosenburg Fellowship.

References 

Living people
Women poets
University of Alabama at Birmingham alumni
Florida International University alumni
Year of birth missing (living people)